The women's tournament of volleyball at the 2011 Summer Universiade at Shenzhen, China began on August 14 and ended on August 21.

Teams

Preliminary round

Group A

|}

|}

Group B

|}

|}

Group C

|}

|}

Group D

|}

|}

Quarterfinal Round

Classification 9-15 places

|}

Quarterfinals

|}

Semifinal Round

Classification 13-15 places

|}

Classification 9-12 places

|}

Classification 5-8 places

|}

Semifinals

|}

Final round

Final 13-14 places

|}

Final 11-12 places

|}

Final 9-10 places

|}

Final 7-8 places

|}

Final 5-6 places

|}

Bronze medal match

|}

Gold Medal match

|}

Final standings

External links
Schedule
Reports

Volleyball at the 2011 Summer Universiade